The Honyman Baronetcy, of Armadale in the County of Orkney, was a title in the Baronetage of the United Kingdom. It was created on 19 May 1804 for William Honyman, a Lord of Session under the judicial title Lord Armadale. The second Baronet sat as Member of Parliament for Orkney. The fourth Baronet was a Judge of the Court of Common Pleas. The title became extinct on the death of the fifth Baronet in 1911.

Robert Honyman, younger brother of the first Baronet, was MP for Orkney From 1796 to 1807.

Honyman baronets, of Armadale (1804)
Sir William Honyman, 1st Baronet (died 1825)
Sir Richard Bempdé Johnstone Honyman, 2nd Baronet (1787–1842)
Sir Ord John Honyman, 3rd Baronet (1794–1863)
Sir George Essex Honyman, 4th Baronet (1819–1875)
Sir William Macdonald Honyman, 5th Baronet (1820–1911)

References

Extinct baronetcies in the Baronetage of the United Kingdom